Mohammad Nadeem may refer to:

 Mohammad Nadeem (Omani cricketer) (born 1982), Omani international cricketer
 Mohammad Nadeem (Emirati cricketer) (born 1978), Emirati international cricketer
 Mohammed Nadeem (Qatari cricketer) (born 1983), Qatari international cricketer
 Mohammad Nadeem (Pakistani cricketer), Pakistani cricketer

See also
 Muhammad Nadeem (born 1972), Pakistani field hockey player